Russel is an alternate spelling of Russell. Russel may also refer to:

People 

Russel Arnold (born 1973), Sri Lankan cricketer
Russel Crouse (1893–1966), American playwright
Russel Farnham (1784–1832), American frontiersman
Russel Honoré (born 1947), American general
Russel Mthembu (born 1947), South African singer
Russel Mwafulirwa (born 1983), Malawian soccer player 
Russel Norman (born 1967), New Zealand politician
Russel Walder (born 1959), American jazz musician
Alfred Russel Wallace (1823–1913), British naturalist
Russel Ward (1914–1995), Australian historian
Russel Wong (born 1961), Singaporean photographer
Russel Wright (1904–1976), American industrial designer
Andrew Russel (1856–1934), American politician
Tony Russel (1925–2017), American actor

Fiction 
Russel Hobbs, fictional drummer character in the virtual band Gorillaz
Wataru Sanzu (also known as Russel Walk in America Version), fictional character in Inazuma Eleven

Other uses 

Russel (grape), another name for the German wine grape Riesling
Russel Creek, Virginia
Russel Range, Canada
Russel Tank, Arizona
Sheikh Russel KC, football club in Bangladesh

See also 

Russell (given name)
Rusty (disambiguation)
Russ (disambiguation)